Awukudae Festival (meaning: "Wednesday ceremony", is a traditional Ashanti festival in Ashanti. Like the Akwasidae Festival, celebrated on a Sunday, Awukudae is part of the celebrations within the Adae Festival cycle. The  festivals of Adae are not interchangeable, having been fixed from ancient times.

Observance
The festival is observed on Wednesday, and its recurrence could be after 40 or 42 days. It is celebrated particularly in the Eastern Region. It is one of the two forms of Adae, the other being Akwasidae, which is celebrated the third Sunday after Awukudae. The observance is an ancestral rite by the chiefs and elders of the Akan clan around Kumasi. The Tuesday which falls 8 days before Awukudae is known as Kwabena; and the Saturday following Awukudae is known as "Memeneda Dapaa". The festival announcement is made by drummers the evening before on "Dapaa" day. After every eight Awukudae Festivals, the "Adae Butu" ritual marks the start of the Odwira festival.

Traditions
Awukudae Festival is marked by Wo tu adae (announcing the day's celebration) drumming on the day preceding it and on Wednesday morning. Atumpan drums and single-air drums perform, but not Fontomfrom drums. In the forenoon, ceremonies are carried on in the Stool-House. The drumming symbolizes the seeking of protection for the guardian ancestral deities to the soul of the ruling king and it unifies the people under his reign. It is believed that Nsamanfoɔ and other ancestors are wandering around to see if this festival is being observed properly. On this occasion, it is also a practice to give donations for charitable causes such as feeding the hungry and helping the sick. On this day, Akanfoɔ consider travel as dangerous and hence remain at home, as it is an emotional day for them.

See also
Adae Festival
Adae Kese Festival
Ashanti Yam Festival
Akwasidae Festival

References

Bibliography

Ashanti people
Cultural festivals in Ghana
Ashanti Region
Festivals in Ghana